Camden Academy Charter High School is a four-year public charter high school that serves students in ninth through twelfth grades from Camden, in Camden County, New Jersey, United States. The school is part of Camden's Promise Charter School and operates under the terms of a charter granted by the New Jersey Department of Education.

As of the 2021–22 school year, the school had an enrollment of 2,244 students and 215.0 classroom teachers (on an FTE basis), for a student–teacher ratio of 10.4:1. There were 1,703 students (75.9% of enrollment) eligible for free lunch and 346 (15.4% of students) eligible for reduced-cost lunch.

Awards, recognition and honors
The school was the 249th-ranked public high school in New Jersey out of 339 schools statewide in New Jersey Monthly magazine's September 2014 cover story on the state's "Top Public High Schools".

Athletics
The Camden Academy Charter High School Cougars compete independently of any league or conference and operates under the auspices of the New Jersey State Interscholastic Athletic Association. With 505 students in grades 10-12, the school was classified by the NJSIAA for the 2019–20 school year as Group II for most athletic competition purposes, which included schools with an enrollment of 486 to 758 students in that grade range. Interscholastic sports offered by the school include baseball, basketball (men and women), softball and volleyball (men and women).

Administration
The school's principal is Dara Ash.

References

External links 
Camden Academy Charter High School

Data for Camden Academy Charter High School, National Center for Education Statistics

2001 establishments in New Jersey
Charter schools in New Jersey
Educational institutions established in 2001
High schools in Camden, New Jersey
Public high schools in Camden County, New Jersey